Saikot is a village in the Chamoli district of Uttarakhand state in India. Situated on the banks of Alaknanda River, it is a proposed y-forked railway junction on Chota Char Dham Railway for two different railways going to Kedarnath and Badrinath.

Geography
Nearby Kedarnath and Badrinath the holiest places of Hinduism called Chota Char Dham.

Transport
It is a y-forked junction the following two Chota Char Dham Railway routes
 Karnaprayag-Saikot-Sonprayag Kedarnath Railway 99 km long route
 Saikot-Joshimath Badrinath Railway, 75 km long route making a "Y" fork connection at Saikot from the Kedarnath railway above.

Rishikesh-Karnaprayag Railway is also an under construction new railway link extension from the exiting Rishikesh railway station to Karnaprayag.

Demographics
 India census, Saikot village with a total population of 805, of which 401 are males while 404 are females.

References

External links

 Chamoli District Map

Cities and towns in Chamoli district